Pepelište is a village in the municipality of Negotino, North Macedonia. It is located in the Povardarie wine-growing region, along the river Vardar.

Demographics
According to the statistics of Bulgarian ethnographer Vasil Kanchov from 1900 the settlement is recorded as "Pepelišta" in which 984 inhabitants lived. 850 of them being Muslim Bulgarians, 80 being Christian Bulgarians and 54 being Romani. On the 1927 ethnic map of Leonhard Schulze-Jena, the village is shown as a Muslim Bulgarian village.According to the 2002 census, the village had a total of 1,070 inhabitants. Ethnic groups in the village include:

Macedonians 796
Turks 33
Serbs 194
Romani 25
Albanians 
Others 22

References

Villages in Negotino Municipality